The 2000 season was the Green Bay Packers' 80th in the National Football League (NFL) and their 82nd overall. It was the first season for which Mike Sherman was the head coach of the team. Sherman was the thirteenth head coach in franchise history. The Packers finished 9–7, failing to qualify for the playoffs. Both the Packers' total offense and total defense ranked 15th in the league.

Offseason

2000 NFL draft
With their first pick (14th overall) in the 2000 NFL draft, the Packers selected future all-pro tight end Bubba Franks. Later in the draft, they selected future long-time starting tackles Chad Clifton and Mark Tauscher, as well as pro bowl defensive end Kabeer Gbaja-Biamila.

 Players highlighted in yellow indicate players selected to the Pro Bowl during their NFL career.

Notable transactions
 March 31, 2000 – The New Orleans Saints send their 3rd round Pick and K. D. Williams to the Green Bay Packers in exchange for Quarterback Aaron Brooks and Tight End Lamont Hall.

Undrafted Free Agents

James Norton-Wide Receiver 
West Virginia University

Personnel

Staff

Roster

Preseason

Regular season

Schedule
The Packers finished in third place in the NFC Central division with a 9–7 record, ahead of the Detroit Lions due to a divisional tiebreaker. This is to date the last season the Packers finished above .500 and missed the playoffs.

Game summaries

Week 5: vs. Chicago Bears

Week 10: vs. Minnesota Vikings

Standings

Best performances 
 Brett Favre, Week 5, 333 Passing Yards vs. Chicago
 Brett Favre, Week 12, 301 Passing Yards vs. Indianapolis
 Antonio Freeman, Week 7, 116 receiving yards vs. San Francisco
 Antonio Freeman, Week 10, 118 receiving yards vs. Minnesota
 Ahman Green, Week 12, 153 rushing yards vs. Indianapolis
 Ahman Green, Week 15, 118 rushing yards vs. Detroit
 Ahman Green, Week 16, 161 rushing yards vs. Minnesota
 Bill Schroeder, Week 12, 155 receiving yards vs. Indianapolis
 Bill Schroeder, Week 14, 119 receiving yards vs. Chicago

Awards and records
 Na'il Diggs, PFW/Pro Football Writers of America All-Rookie Team
 Brett Favre, NFC leader, passing attempts (580)
 Ryan Longwell, NFC Special Teams Player of the Week, week 3
 Ryan Longwell, NFC Special Teams Player of the Week, week 16
 Ryan Longwell, NFC leader, field goals made (33)
 Ryan Longwell, NFC leader, field goals attempted (38)
 Allen Rossum, NFC Special Teams Player of the Week, week 12
 Darren Sharper, NFL leader, interceptions (9)
 Darren Sharper, All-NFL Team (selected by Associated Press and Pro Football Weekly)
 Darren Sharper, Associated Press All-Pro selection
 Darren Sharper, Pro Football Writers of America All-Pro selection

References

Green Bay Packers seasons
Green Bay Packers
Green